From August 19, 2013 to March 23, 2014, the following skiing events took place at various locations around the world.

Alpine skiing

 October 26, 2013 – March 16, 2014: 2013–14 FIS Alpine Skiing World Cup
 October 26 – 27: World Cup #1:  Sölden
 Men's Giant Slalom winner:  Ted Ligety
 Women's Giant Slalom winner:  Lara Gut
 November 16 – 17: World Cup #2:  Levi
 Men's Slalom winner:  Marcel Hirscher
 Women's Slalom winner:  Mikaela Shiffrin
 November 26 – December 1: World Cup #3:  Beaver Creek
 Women's Giant Slalom winner:  Jessica Lindell-Vikarby
 Women's Super G winner:  Lara Gut
 Women's Downhill winner:  Lara Gut
 November 27 – December 1: World Cup #4:  Lake Louise
 Men's Super G winner:  Aksel Lund Svindal
 Men's Downhill winner:  Dominik Paris
 December 3 – 8: World Cup #5:  Lake Louise
 Women's Super G winner:  Lara Gut
 Women's Downhill #1 winner:  Maria Höfl-Riesch
 Women's Downhill #2 winner:  Maria Höfl-Riesch
 December 3 – 8: World Cup #6:  Beaver Creek
 Men's Giant Slalom winner:  Ted Ligety
 Men's Super G winner:  Patrick Küng
 Men's Downhill winner:  Aksel Lund Svindal
 December 14 – 15: World Cup #7:  St. Moritz
 Women's Giant Slalom winner:  Tessa Worley
 Women's Super G winner:  Tina Weirather
 December 14 – 15: World Cup #8:  Val-d'Isère
 Men's Slalom winner:  Mario Matt
 Men's Giant Slalom winner:  Marcel Hirscher
 December 17: World Cup #9:  Courchevel
 Women's Slalom winner:  Marlies Schild
 December 18 – 21: World Cup #10:  Val Gardena
 Men's Super G winner:  Aksel Lund Svindal
 Men's Downhill winner:  Erik Guay
 December 18 – 22: World Cup #11:  Val-d'Isère
 Women's Giant Slalom winner:  Tina Weirather
 Women's Downhill winner:  Marianne Kaufmann-Abderhalden
 December 22: World Cup #12:  Alta Badia
 Men's Giant Slalom winner:  Marcel Hirscher
 December 27 – 29: World Cup #13:  Bormio
 Men's Downhill winner:  Aksel Lund Svindal
 December 28 – 29: World Cup #14:  Lienz
 Women's Slalom winner:  Marlies Schild
 Women's Giant Slalom winner:  Anna Fenninger
 January 5 – 6, 2014: World Cup #16:  Bormio
 Women's Slalom winner:  Mikaela Shiffrin
 Men's Slalom winner:  Felix Neureuther
 January 9 – 12: World Cup #17:  Altenmarkt
 Women's Downhill winner:  Elisabeth Görgl
 Women's Super Combined winner:  Marie-Michèle Gagnon
 January 11 – 12: World Cup #18:  Adelboden
 Men's Giant Slalom winner:  Felix Neureuther
 Men's Slalom winner:  Marcel Hirscher
 January 14: World Cup #19:  Flachau
 Women's Slalom winner:  Mikaela Shiffrin
 January 14 – 19: World Cup #20:  Wengen
 Men's Super Combined winner:  Ted Ligety
 Men's Downhill winner:  Patrick Küng
 Men's Slalom winner:  Alexis Pinturault
 January 16 – 19: World Cup #21:  Kitzbühel
 Men's Slalom winner:  Felix Neureuther
 Men's Downhill winner:  Hannes Reichelt 
 Men's Super G winner:  Didier Défago
 Men's Super Combined winner:  Alexis Pinturault
 January 23 – 26: World Cup #22:  Cortina d'Ampezzo
 Women's Super G #1 winner:  Elisabeth Görgl
 Women's Super G #2 winner:  Lara Gut
 Women's Downhill #1 winner:  Maria Höfl-Riesch
 Women's Downhill #2 winner:  Tina Maze
 January 28: World Cup #23:  Schladming
 Men's Slalom winner:  Henrik Kristoffersen
 January 30 – February 2: World Cup #24:  St. Moritz
 Men's Giant Slalom winner:  Ted Ligety
 February 1 – 2: World Cup #25:  Kranjska Gora
 Women's Slalom winner:  Frida Hansdotter
 February 25: World Cup #26:  Innsbruck
 Mixed Team Event winner: 
 February 27 – March 2: World Cup #27:  Crans-Montana
 Women's Downhill winner:  Andrea Fischbacher
 February 27 – March 2: World Cup #28:  Kvitfjell
 Men's Downhill #1 winners:  Kjetil Jansrud/ Georg Streitberger
 Men's Downhill #2 winner:  Erik Guay
 Men's Super G winner:  Kjetil Jansrud
 March 6 – 8: World Cup #29:  Åre
 Women's Giant Slalom #1 winner:  Anna Fenninger
 Women's Giant Slalom #2 winner:  Anna Fenninger
 Women's Slalom winner:  Mikaela Shiffrin
 March 8 – 9: World Cup #30:  Kranjska Gora
 Men's Giant Slalom winner:  Ted Ligety
 Men's Slalom winner:  Felix Neureuther
 March 10 – 16: World Cup #31 (final):  Lenzerheide
 Men's Downhill winner:  Matthias Mayer
 Women's Downhill winner:  Lara Gut
 Men's Super G winner:  Alexis Pinturault
 Women's Super G winner:  Lara Gut
 Mixed Team Event winners: 
 Women's Slalom winner:  Mikaela Shiffrin
 Men's Giant Slalom winner:  Ted Ligety
 Men's Slalom winner:  Marcel Hirscher
 Women's Giant Slalom winner:  Anna Fenninger
 Men's Downhill overall winner:  Aksel Lund Svindal
 Men's Super G overall winner:  Aksel Lund Svindal
 Men's Giant Slalom overall winner:  Ted Ligety
 Men's Slalom overall winner:  Marcel Hirscher
 Men's Combined overall winners:  Ted Ligety and  Alexis Pinturault (tie)
 Men's Overall winner:  Marcel Hirscher
 Ladies' Downhill overall winner:  Maria Höfl-Riesch
 Ladies' Super G overall winner:  Lara Gut
 Ladies' Giant Slalom overall winner:  Anna Fenninger
 Ladies' Slalom overall winner:  Mikaela Shiffrin
 Ladies' Combined overall winner:  Marie-Michèle Gagnon
 Ladies' Overall winner:  Anna Fenninger
 Men's Nations Cup winner: 
 Ladies' Nations Cup winner: 
 Overall Nations Cup winner: 
 February 9 – 22: 2014 Winter Olympics
  won both the gold and overall medal tallies.

Biathlon

 November 22, 2013 – March 16, 2014: 2013–14 Winter IBU Cup
  won both the gold and overall medal tallies.
 November 22, 2013 – March 23, 2014: 2013–14 Biathlon World Cup
 Men's Sprint overall winner:  Martin Fourcade
 Men's Pursuit overall winner:  Martin Fourcade
 Men's Individual overall winner:  Emil Hegle Svendsen
 Men's Mass Start overall winner:  Martin Fourcade
 Men's Relay overall winner: 
 Men's Overall winner:  Martin Fourcade
 Women's Sprint overall winner:  Kaisa Mäkäräinen
 Women's Pursuit overall winner:  Kaisa Mäkäräinen
 Women's Individual overall winner:  Gabriela Soukalová
 Women's Mass Start overall winner:  Darya Domracheva
 Women's Relay overall winner: 
 Women's Overall winner:  Kaisa Mäkäräinen
 January 27 – February 4: IBU Open European Championships at  Nové Město na Moravě
  won both the gold and overall medal tallies.
 February 8 – 22: 2014 Winter Olympics
  and  won 3 gold medals each. However, Norway won the overall medal tally.
 February 26 – March 7: IBU Youth/Junior World Championships at  Presque Isle, Maine
  won both the gold and overall medal tallies.

Cross-country skiing

 November 29, 2013 – March 16, 2014: 2013–14 FIS Cross-Country World Cup
 Men's Distance overall winner:  Martin Johnsrud Sundby
 Men's Sprint overall winner:  Ola Vigen Hattestad
 Men's Overall winner:  Martin Johnsrud Sundby
 Ladies' Distance overall winner:  Therese Johaug
 Ladies' Sprint overall winner:  Kikkan Randall
 Ladies' Overall winner:  Therese Johaug
 February 8 – 23: 2014 Winter Olympics
  won the gold medal tally.

Freestyle skiing

 December 6, 2013 – March 23, 2014: 2013–14 FIS Freestyle Skiing World Cup
 Men's Moguls overall winner:  Mikaël Kingsbury
 Men's Ski Cross overall winner:  Victor Öhling Norberg
 Men's Aerials overall winner:  Liu Zhongqing
 Men's Halfpipe overall winner:  Justin Dorey
 Men's Slopestyle overall winner:  Jesper Tjäder
 Men's Overall winner:  Mikaël Kingsbury
 Women's Moguls overall winner:  Hannah Kearney
 Women's Ski Cross overall winner:  Marielle Thompson
 Women's Aerials overall winner:  Li Nina
 Women's Halfpipe overall winner:  Devin Logan
 Women's Slopestyle overall winner:  Lisa Zimmermann
 Women's Overall winner:  Hannah Kearney
 Nations' Cup overall winner: 
 February 6 – 21: 2014 Winter Olympics
  won the gold and overall medal tallies.

Nordic combined

 November 30, 2013 – March 16, 2014: 2013–14 FIS Nordic Combined World Cup
 Overall winner:  Eric Frenzel
 Overall Nations Cup winner: 
 February 12 – 20: 2014 Winter Olympics
 Individual large hill & 10 km XC skiing:   Jørgen Graabak;   Magnus Moan;   Fabian Rießle
 Normal hill & 10 km XC skiing:   Eric Frenzel;   Akito Watabe;   Magnus Krog
 Team large hill & 4x5km XC skiing:  ;  ;

Ski jumping

 November 22, 2013 – March 23, 2014: 2013–14 FIS Ski Jumping World Cup
 Men's Ski Flying overall winner:  Peter Prevc
 Men's Overall winner:  Kamil Stoch
 Men's Nations Cup winner: 
 Women's Overall winner:  Sara Takanashi
 Women's Nations Cup winner: 
 February 8 – 17: 2014 Winter Olympics
 Men's normal hill:   Kamil Stoch;   Peter Prevc;   Anders Bardal
 Men's large hill:   Kamil Stoch;   Noriaki Kasai;   Peter Prevc
 Men's team:  ;  ;  
 Women's normal hill:   Carina Vogt;   Daniela Iraschko-Stolz;   Coline Mattel

Snowboarding

 August 19, 2013 – March 15, 2014: 2013–14 FIS Snowboard World Cup
 Men's Snowboard Cross overall winner:  Omar Visintin
 Ladies' Snowboard Cross overall winner:  Dominique Maltais
 Men's Parallel overall winner:  Lukas Mathies
 Ladies' Parallel overall winner:  Patrizia Kummer
 Men's snowboard freestyle overall winner:  Måns Hedberg
 Ladies' snowboard freestyle overall winner:  Šárka Pančochová
 Men's halfpipe overall winner:  Scott James
 Ladies' halfpipe overall winner:  Kelly Clark
 Men's slope style overall winner:  Måns Hedberg
 Ladies' slope style overall winner:  Šárka Pančochová
 Men's Big Air winner:  Petja Piiroinen
 February 6 – 22: 2014 Winter Olympics
  won both the gold and overall medal tallies.

References

External links
 International Ski Federation official website
 IPC Alpine Skiing official website
 International Biathlon Union official website
 IPC Biathlon and Cross Country Skiing official website

Skiing by year
Skiing
Skiing